Newcomb is an unincorporated community in Campbell County, Tennessee, United States. It is situated in the Elk Fork Creek Valley in the Cumberland Mountains, southwest of Jellico.  Tennessee State Route 297 passes through the community.  The ZIP Code for Newcomb is 37819.

History
Newcomb formed in the 19th century as the location of a railroad station on the Knoxville and Ohio Railroad (now part of the Southern Railway). A post office was established in Newcomb in 1883.

References

Unincorporated communities in Campbell County, Tennessee
Unincorporated communities in Tennessee